The 2022 IIHF U20 Asia and Oceania Championship was an international men's under-20 ice hockey tournament run by the International Ice Hockey Federation (IIHF). The tournament took place between 25 June and 2 July at Thailand International Ice Hockey Arena in Bangkok, Thailand, and was the sixth edition held since its formation in 2012 under the IIHF Asia and Oceania Championship series of tournaments. To be eligible as a "junior" player in this tournament, a player cannot be born earlier than 2002.

Thailand won its first U20 Asia and Oceania Championship and its first gold medal ever on home ice after defeating Singapore 4–3 in the gold medal game. Hong Kong won the bronze medal after a 6–5 victory over the United Arab Emirates. Malaysia finished 5th place, while the Philippines finished 6th place after being affected by the COVID-19 pandemic, forcing them to withdraw partway through the tournament and forfeit their last two games.

Overview

Participants

Group A

Group B

Match officials
5 referees and 8 linesmen were selected for the tournament.

Referees
  Yahya Al-Jneibi
  Yu Jin Ang
  Park Jae-Hyung
  Aomsim Ukbolluck
  Mohamad Faris Hakimin Yusoff

Linesmen
  Ahmed Al-Farsi
  Ekkaphol Attaprachar
  Arnupap Charoenrak
  Yong Elbert Cheah
  Jien Yang Chua
  Qiwei Huang
  Edmond Ng
  Jakkrit Songleksing

Preliminary round
All times are in Thailand Standard Time (UTC+7).

Group A

Group B

Playoff round

Quarterfinals

5th place game

7th place game

Semifinals

Bronze medal game

Gold medal game

Final ranking

References

2021–22 in Asian ice hockey
2022 sports events in Bangkok
IIHF Challenge Cups of Asia
International sports competitions hosted by Thailand
IIHF U20 Asia and Oceania Championship
IIHF U20 Asia and Oceania Championship
IIHF U20 Asia and Oceania Championship
Asian ice hockey competitions for junior teams